Duły  is a village in the administrative district of Gmina Olecko, within Olecko County, Warmian-Masurian Voivodeship, in north-eastern Poland. It is located on the northern shore of Dobskie Lake in the region of Masuria.

History
Duły was founded in 1558 by Jan Duła, who bought land to establish a village. It was named after the founder. As of 1600, the population of the village was solely Polish. In 1939, it had a population of 260.

References

Populated lakeshore places in Poland
Villages in Olecko County
1558 establishments in Poland
Populated places established in 1558